Lieutenant General Tayza Kyaw (also spelt Tay Zar Kyaw) is a Burmese military officer known for his role in leading Operation Anawrahta, the military's attempt to suppress resistance forces in Upper Myanmar in the aftermath of the 2021 Myanmar coup d'état.

Military career 
Tayza Kyaw graduated from the 73rd intake of the Officers Training School, Bahtoo. He is the incumbent commander of Bureau of Special Operations No. 1. In February 2022, he was sanctioned by the European Union for committing military atrocities and abuses in the aftermath of the 2021 Myanmar coup d'état.

See also 

 2021 Myanmar coup d'état
 State Administration Council
 Tatmadaw

References 

Living people
Burmese generals
Officers Training School, Bahtoo alumni
Year of birth missing (living people)